Horom (Rom) is a Plateau language of Nigeria.

Neighbouring ethnic groups consider the Rom to be culturally part of the Ron, who are West Chadic speakers. The Rom people are also known for their xylophones.

References

Sources
Blench, Roger. 2012. Horom wordlist.

Languages of Nigeria
East Plateau languages